Adam Hanes (born 17 June 2002) is a Slovak footballer who plays for Dukla Banská Bystrica as a attacking-midfielder.

Club career
Hanes made his Fortuna Liga debut for Dukla Banská Bystrica against FC Spartak Trnava on 24 July 2022.

References

External links
 MFK Dukla Banská Bystrica official club profile 
 Futbalnet profile 
 
 

2002 births
Living people
Sportspeople from Zvolen
Slovak footballers
Association football midfielders
MFK Dukla Banská Bystrica players
MFK Dolný Kubín players
Slovak Super Liga players
2. Liga (Slovakia) players